2 Cassiopeiae (2 Cas) is a white bright giant in the constellation Cassiopeia, about 2,800 light years away.  It is a chemically peculiar Am star.

2 Cassiopeiae has been described as an A4 type bright giant, buts its spectrum is not easy to classify.  The calcium K absorption lines indicate a hotter type than the hydrogen lines, while other metals indicate a cooler type, possibly as cool as F0.  This makes it an Am star, a type of magnetic chemically peculiar star with unusual abundances showing in its spectrum due to chemical stratification in its atmosphere caused by slow rotation.

Some researchers have suggested that it is a post-AGB star.

2 Cassiopeiae has a number of close companions listed in multiple star catalogues, but none are thought to be gravitationally associated.

References

A-type bright giants
Cassiopeia (constellation)
Cassiopeiae, 02
8822
218753
114365
BD+58 2552
Am stars